Weishaupt is a German surname. Notable people with the surname include:

 Adam Weishaupt (1748–1830), German philosopher and founder of the Order of Illuminati
 Karl von Weishaupt (1787–1853), Bavarian Lieutenant General and War Minister
 Johann Georg Weishaupt (1717–1753), professor of law at the University of Ingolstadt
 Erich Weishaupt (born 1952), Ice Hockey player

See also
Weißhaupt

German-language surnames